Anton Krásnohorský (22 October 1925 – 25 July 1988) was a Slovak footballer who played as a defender. He played for several clubs, including Iskra Žilina. He made nine appearances for the Czechoslovakia national team and was a participant at the 1954 FIFA World Cup.

External links
 
 Profile at CMFS website

1925 births
1988 deaths
Slovak footballers
Czechoslovak footballers
Association football defenders
Czechoslovakia international footballers
1954 FIFA World Cup players
MŠK Žilina players